The , colloquially known as  (VÖB, "association of public banks") is a German national association of development banks and of the regional Landesbanks, which are part of the Sparkassen-Finanzgruppe and thus also members of the Deutscher Sparkassen- und Giroverband (DSGV, self-translated as "German Savings Banks Association"), plus a few additional members. Some of the latter now belong to the private sector, such as Internationales Bankenhaus Bodensee which belonged to the public sector until the 2000s.

Membership 

As of mid-2022, the VÖB's ordinary membership included:
 the federal development bank KfW (formerly ) and its export financing subsidiary KfW IPEX-Bank, both based in Frankfurt
 Landwirtschaftliche Rentenbank in Frankfurt, a national agricultural development bank
 the regional development banks of the 16 respective German states, namely: 
  (IB.SH) in Kiel, for Schleswig-Holstein
  in Schwerin, for Mecklenburg-Vorpommern
  (IFB Hamburg) for Hamburg
  (BAB) for Bremen
 Investitionsbank Berlin for Berlin
  (ILB) in Potsdam, for Brandenburg
  in Magdeburg, for Saxony-Anhalt
  (SAB) in Leipzig, for Saxony
 NRW.Bank in Dusseldorf and Münster, for North Rhine-Westphalia
 Thüringer Aufbaubank in Erfurt, for Thuringia
  (WI Bank) in Offenbach am Main, for Hesse
  (ISB) in Mainz, for Rhineland-Palatinate
  (SIKB) in Saarbrücken, for Saarland
 , formerly  in Munich, for Bavaria
 several non-retail member banks of the Sparkassen-Finanzgruppe: 
 Norddeutsche Landesbank (NORD/LB) in Hanover
 Landesbank Hessen Thüringen (known as Helaba from its former name Hessische Landesbank) in Frankfurt and Erfurt
 Landesbank Saar (SaarLB) in Saarbrücken
 Landesbank Baden-Württemberg (LBBW) in Stuttgart
 Bayerische Landesbank (BayernLB) in Munich
 DekaBank in Frankfurt
 five diverse additional institutions: 
  in Hanover
 Deutsche Kreditbank (DKB) in Berlin, a subsidiary of BayernLB
 Internationales Bankenhaus Bodensee (IBB) in Friedrichshafen, a subsidiary of Würth
  in Stade, a subsidiary of  
  in Berlin, a subsidiary of 

Deposit insurance 

This became largely redundant and was phased out after the regional development banks were removed from the scope of EU banking and deposit insurance law in a revision of the EU Capital Requirements Regulation (CRR). The Landesbanken and DekaBank are affiliated with the deposit insurance and institutional protection scheme of the Sparkassen-Finanzgruppe.

Its only five members are Calenberger Kreditverein, Deutsche Kreditbank (DKB), Internationales Bankenhaus Bodensee, Landwirtschaftliche Rentenbank, and Ritterschaftliches Kreditinstitut Stade.

Presidents 

The President chairs the executive board of the VÖB.

 1970–1976: Kurt Hähnel
 1976–1987: Hans Fahning
 1987–2001: 
 2001–2004: 
 2004–2007: 
 2007–2009: 
 2009–2013: 
 2013–2016: 
 2016–2018: 
 2019–present: Eckhard Forst

History

 1916:  established in Berlin
 1924:  established, renamed  in 1937 
  established in Stuttgart; renamed  in 1932
 1934:  and  merged into entity based in Karlsruhe and named  in 1935
 1950:  (LTH) established in Frankfurt by agreement of the state of Hesse and 
 1951:  established in Frankfurt
  established in Saarbrücken
  established in Munich
 1972:  and  merged into 
 1974:  renamed 
 1991: Sächsische Aufbaubank established in Leipzig by 
 1992:  established in Potsdam
 Thüringer Aufbaubank established in Erfurt
 1993:  established in Magdeburg
  integrated into Landesbank Berlin as Investitionsbank Berlin 
  spun off from  
 1994:  established in Schwerin
 1998: L-Bank formed from the development finance activities of 
 2002: NRW.Bank spun off from WestLB
 Sächsische Aufbaubank ownership transferred from L-Bank to the state of Saxony
 2004:  established in Hanover
  transformed into 
 Investitionsbank Berlin spun off from Landesbank Berlin
 2009: LTH and  merged into

See also

 Sparkassen-Finanzgruppe
 German Banking Industry Committee
 Public bank

References

External links
Sparkassen-Finanzgruppe
Sparkasse
Useful information about the Sparkassen-Finanzgruppe (in English)

Banks of Germany
Public finance of Germany
Government-owned companies of Germany
Government-owned banks